Herschel C. Logan was an American artist and founding member of the Prairie Print Makers. He is known primarily today for his woodcuts of serene, nostalgic scenes of Midwest small towns and farms -- mostly Kansas subjects -- rendered in precise, clean lines. He earned both international acclaim as well as the nickname "The Prairie Woodcutter".

His work shows a deep admiration and respect for the beauty of rural America, and great skill in its portrayal. People were seldom a subject in these works beyond small figures as part of the landscape, though he also produced many portraits of famous Americans and other historical figures. Logan's work is similar to that of his contemporary J. J. Lankes. Scenes of rural life are dominant in both artists’ woodcuts, and both use an “L” monogram to sign their works in the print.

From 1921 to 1938, Logan produced some 140 woodcuts in editions up to 50, but then gave up printmaking as a profession. In the following nearly 50 years, he was an author and illustrator, a collector, a noted authority on firearms, and a publisher of miniature books.

Early life and education
Logan was born on April 19, 1901, in Magnolia, Missouri to Oliver Cary Logan (1877-1944)
and Leota Pinkie Bills Logan (1880-1902). After the death of his mother in January 1902 his father took the remaining family, including his grandparents, to live on a farm near Winfield, Kansas. At Winfield High School he became the staff cartoonist for the school newspaper, The Oracle. After graduation in 1920 he studied commercial art at the Chicago Academy of Fine Arts. He also took courses at the Olivet Institute in Chicago and through the Federal School (aka Art Instruction, Incorporated), a correspondence art school in Minneapolis.

On June 20, 1924, Logan married his first wife, Susie Titus (1902-1990), in Wichita, Kansas. They had two children, Samuel Herschel Logan and Peggy Joan Logan.

Career
After a year of studying art in Chicago, Logan took a position as branch manager for Salina Mid-Continent Engraving before accepting a job as a commercial artist for the McCormick-Armstrong Lithography Company in Wichita. One of his contributions was a series of woodcuts offered as “Exclusive Holiday Greetings from Wood Cuts by Herschel C. Logan”.

Logan left Wichita in 1929 to work for the Consolidated Printing and Stationery Company in Salina, becoming its director in 1931. He stayed there until he retired in 1967, and soon after moved to Santa Ana, California. There he met and married his second wife, Anne Lawrence Serven, in 1970. Soon after, Logan started a new career publishing miniature books (see below), and would travel around California drawing and painting trees and landscapes, typically ink or graphite with watercolor.

Logan died on December 8, 1987 in Santa Ana, California.

Printmaking
It was at the Olivet Institute that Logan met fellow artists like Glenn Golton, Louis Grell, and Harry Muir Kurtzworth. A friendship with C.A. Seward, a well-known Kansas printmaker, heightened Logan's interest in woodcuts; it also put Logan in contact with other printmakers such as Lloyd Foltz, Charles Capps, Clarence Hotvedt, and Leo Courtney and painter Birger Sandzen from nearby Lindsborg. It was through these friendships that Logan learned the art of printmaking, and that eventually led to their founding, with others, the Prairie Print Makers society in 1930. There Logan “lent his skill as a craftsman and instinctive aptitude for carving wood blocks that had established his national recognition by the age of twenty-three.”

Logan gained considerable recognition for his body of editioned woodcuts, most of them about Kansas. He was exhibited extensively in the Mid-West, but also at international exhibitions in  Los Angeles and at the 1939 New York World's Fair. Logan worked from life, using photographs or sketches he made on location, often finding inspiration in simple structures by the roadside while driving. He would spend several days studying and refining a sketch before proceeding.

In 1938 Logan collaborated on a book entitled “Other Days in Pictures and Verse”. Presenting a nostalgic view of  "The Good Old Days" in small town America, it incorporates 12 woodcuts, prose poems by Everett Scrogin, and decorations by C.A. Seward.

Portraits were another favorite subject for Logan. Twelve prints of famous Americans were gathered into a book with short biographies, and later reissued as a calendar by the Consolidated Printing Company.

Famous printers and printmakers throughout history were another focus of Logan's portraiture. He produced over 100 portraits in pen in ink for a book project “Great Names in Printing Through Six Centuries” that was never realized despite having lithographic reproductions prepared and possible page mockups. Fifteen of these were published posthumously in the miniature book Portraits of Some Famous Printers as a keepsake for the 1992 joint meeting of the Roxburghe & Zamorano Clubs.

Logan abandoned fine art printmaking in general after 1938. Logan himself recalled “...after my friend Seward’s long illness and death [Jan 31, 1939], I simply lost interest in making prints.” “But perhaps more to blame were Herschel’s restless energies which were diverted to other enterprises.” By then he had thoroughly explored his love of the Kansas countryside from farms to towns to landmarks, often revisiting scenes often in different seasons or different times of the day. Logan later reflected “After World War II, abstract art and painting became more popular and took over, and printmaking just kind of fell apart."

Logan did not completely abandon woodblock printing, nor its companions linocut and rubber plates. Throughout his career he advocated woodcut as a desirable medium for a straightforward presentation of an idea in his commercial work and designed many woodcut logos, emblems and bookplates. This extended to a woodcut style – he emulated woodcuts in many of his commercial work and later drawings, a technique he developed for advertising purposes, “satisfactory and yet may be produced quickly and with less difficulty”. Logon continued to produce numerous portraits throughout his life, generally in pen and ink. A large collection is found in his “Little Portraits of Famous Americans”, a miniature book from 1973.

Consolidated Printing
In 1939, Logan began hosting “The Consolidated Hour”, a weekly series of radio talks on KSAL in which he talked about Kansas industries. Starting January 2, 1939, he introduced “The Colonel” in advertisements for Consolidated Printing and Stationery. The Colonel was a dapper cartoon gentleman in a long black frock coat and vest, sporting a Kentucky Colonel necktie, a wide-brimmed Stetson hat, a handlebar mustache, and a goatee. He offered short bits of homespun philosophy, “sometimes serious, sometimes merely amusing, but never bitter”. Logan himself describes The Colonel as a bit of Abe Lincoln, Will Rogers, Teddy Roosevelt and other characters he admired. A mainstay of Consolidated advertising, The Colonel appeared weekly in the Salina Journal for nearly 30 years. Logan both drew and wrote copy for the Colonel, becoming so identified with his creation that “The Colonel” became a widely used nickname among colleagues and friends. Indeed, as Logan himself was a Kentucky Colonel since 1934 and sometimes dressed the part, “The Colonel" was very much his alter ego.

Logan contributed a considerable amount of art to Consolidated's work products through the years, from small decoration to full illustrations. An advertising sheet contains numerous samples of his work. A postcard illustration of the Brookville Hotel in Brookville, Kansas, shows his use of the woodcut style.

Firearms and ammunition
Since Logan was young he was interested in guns, whittling rifles and pistols as a boy on the farm. He collected his first antique firearm, a blunderbuss, in 1932. As his collection grew, Logan became an expert in firearms and ammunition, authoring and illustrating a number of books that continue to be standard historical references. He also contributed drawings and articles to the American Rifleman over a period of more than two decades. Logan became a popular lecturer in the Civil War Roundtable circuit as a noted collector and historian.

When Logan purchased a Smith & Wesson American .44 engraved “Texas Jack, Cottonwood Spring, 1872”, he learned all he could about John B. “Texas Jack” Omohundro, a colorful Old West showman and scout. The result was the book “Buckskin and Satin: The Life of Texas Jack (J.B. Omohundro)”.

Other gun-related texts:
 Cartridges: a Pictorial Digest of Small Arms Ammunition
 Hand Cannon to Automatic: A Pictorial Parade of Hand Arms
 The Little Book of Guns: A Chronology
 The Muzzle Loading Rifle Then and Now
 The Pictorial History of the Underhammer Gun

Miniature books
Since his Consolidated Printing days Logan had been fascinated by the art and craft of printing and publishing.  In 1940 he built a small-scale working model of Gutenberg's press out of wood for a display as part of the 500th Anniversary of Printing. In 1973 he purchased a Baby Reliance Hand Press and started a new career as a publisher of miniature books. The Log-Anne Press, named after him and his wife, operated out of a studio behind their Santa Ana home. The company published some 50 books.

Collecting
Logan's interests were broad and found expression in a number of valuable collections. An early love was the Civil War, sparked when he learned his maternal grandfather had been active in that conflict.  By 1967, he had a collection of over 600 antique guns and edged weapons, focused on the Civil War and other items. “My collection included … firearms, uniforms, badges, medical gear, battle rattle, souvenirs – anything that would present a picture of the times through the relics that were left.”

In the 1930s, Logan wrote to illustrators Herbert Johnson and J.N. “Ding” Darling, hoping to start a collection of cartoon art. He offered some of his work for theirs, and to his surprise, they agreed. He continued to barter his work for the works of others, amassing one of the greatest collections of cartoon and illustrator art from the 19th and 20th century. The cartoons are now in the special collections department at Kansas State University Library. Twelve oil paintings by American magazine illustrators are in the care of the Marianna Kistler Beach Museum of Art.

His other collections included:
 Rare 18 and 32 pound Sibley stoves
 A set of John Rogers Civil War sculptures
 Civil War era sabers and swords, including a sword from the Quantrill raid on Lawrence, Kansas
 Dime Novels

As well as:
 Mustache Cups
 Relics and Curios

Activities
Except as noted, items are from “In Memoriam, Herschel C. Logan”.

Salinas, Kansas 1929-1968
 Art Director, Consolidated Printing and Stationery Co. for 37 years
 Chief, Auxiliary Police, World War II
 President, Salinas Rotary Club,1949–50
 Director, Salinas Chamber of Commerce
 President, Christian Laymen's Association
 Member, City Planning Board
 Secretary, Board of Trustees, Salina Public Library

State and national activities
 Board of Directors, Kansas State Historical Society
 Vice-president, American Society of Arms Collectors, 1955–56
 President, American Society of Arms Collectors, 1957–58
 Member of Board of Directors, American Society of Arms Collectors
 Fellow of the company, Military Historians and Collectors
 Member, Arms and Armour Society of England
 Life Member, Muzzle-Loading Rifle Association
 Contributing Editor, “The American Rifleman”
 Member, Los Angeles Corral of the Westerners
 Member, Company of Military Historians and “fellow” of the company

Memberships
 Salina Lodge No. 60 A.F. & A.M.
 Salina Consistory
 Salina Chapter No. 18 Royal Arch Masons
 Askelon Commandery No. 6, K.T.
 Isis Temple Shrine
 El Bandito Shrine Club, Santa Ana, California
 Past President, Los Compadres con Libros
 Trinity United Presbyterian Church, Santa Ana

Works
 See List of works of Herschel C. Logan

Exhibitions and awards

Collections and archives
An extensive collection of over 1600 prints (published and unpublished), books, paintings, drawing, studies, sketchbooks, original wooden blocks and other artifacts, plus Logan's collection of cartoon and illustrator art, can be found at the Marianna Kistler Beach Museum of Art, Kansas State University. All their holdings have been digitized.

Additional collections:
 Amon Carter Museum of American Art, Research Library. Herschel Logan : Artist Files
 Charlotte M. Smith Collection of Miniature Books, University Archives, The University of Iowa Libraries: a large collection of Log-Anne Press and other miniature books
 Cleveland Museum of Art, Ingalls Library. Logan, Herschel C., 1901-. artist file
 Emprise Bank Art Gallery
 Kansas Museum of History
 Sandzén Memorial Art Gallery
 University of California, Irvine, Langson Library.The Westerners collection
 Ablah Library. Wichita State University, Artist File: Herschel C. Logan
 Wichita Art Museum, 170+ items including most of Logan's miniature books.

Sources
 Baker, L.V. “Herschel C. Logan, Personality Profile”, Arms Gazette. North Hollywood, Calif., Bienfeld Pub. Co., Apr 1971.
 Baldwin, Sara M, and Robert M. Baldwin. Illustriana Kansas: Biographical Sketches of Kansas Men and Women of Achievement Who Have Been Awarded Life Membership in Kansas Illustriana Society. Hebron, Nebraska: Illustriana Incorporated, 1933. Print.
 Conrads, David, and Pamela Evans (Editors). The Prairie Print Makers. Exhibits USA, 2001
 Craig, Susan. Biographical Dictionary of Kansas Artists (active Before 1945). Lawrence, KS: Susan V. Craig, 2009. Internet resource. url:https://kuscholarworks.ku.edu/handle/1808/1028
 “From Printmaking to Making Books”, Tampa Book Arts Studio, 1 Apr. 2020.
 Krause, Rachel. “Herschel Logan's Intricate Wood Prints Take Viewers Back to Kansas' Dust Bowl Days”. Medium, Medium, 14 Oct. 2018. url: https://medium.com/@rachel_krause/herschel-logans-wood-prints-highlight-scenes-from-kansas-farmland-bb5fe64bcf8. 
 Lehman, Anthony L. Herschel Logan: Man of Many Careers. (Los Angeles: Westerners, Los Angeles Corral, 1986).
 Midwestern Artists’ Exhibition (Kansas City: Kansas City Art Institute, 1920-1942 
 Mines, Cynthia. For the Sake of Art: The Story of an Art Movement in Kansas. s.l. Mines, 1979.
 North, Cori Sherman. “In the Center of It All: 90 Years of the Prairie Print Makers”, [Lindsborg, Kansas]: The Birger Sandzén Memorial Foundation, 2020. 
 O'Neill, Barbara T, George C. Foreman, and Howard W. Ellington. The Prairie Print Makers. 1984. Print.
 Reinbach, Edna, comp. “Kansas Art and Artists”, in Collections of the Kansas State Historical Society. v. 17, 1928. p. 571-585.
 Sain, Lydia, comp. Festival of Kansas Arts and Crafts. Catalog: Arts and Crafts of Kansas: an Exhibition held in Lawrence, Feb. 18-22, 1948 in the Community Building. Lawrence: World Co., 1948.

References

1901 births
1987 deaths
American printmakers
American illustrators
20th-century printmakers
Woodcut designers